The Lou Henson Award is an award given annually by CollegeInsider.com to the most outstanding mid-major men's college basketball player in NCAA Division I competition. The award, established in 2010, is named for legendary Illinois Fighting Illini head coach Lou Henson. Henson, who also coached at Hardin–Simmons and New Mexico State, compiled 779 all-time wins. He is in the top 10 of NCAA coaching wins in men's basketball history.

Background
At the same time the Henson Award was established, CollegeInsider.com also created the Lou Henson All-America Team, consisting of the 30 players that its selection committee deems to be the top Division I mid-major players. Unlike most other All-America teams in basketball and other sports, the Henson All-America Team is not divided into different grades (e.g., first team, second team, third team, honorable mention)—all players are treated equally as All-Americans.

Starting with the 2011–12 season, the number of Henson All-Americans was reduced to 25. This coincided with the decision of CollegeInsider.com to establish a Lute Olson All-America Team in conjunction with its Lute Olson Award for the top player who has played at least two years at his current school. The Olson All-America Team also has 25 members; unlike the Olson or Henson Awards, this team is open to all players regardless of their year of attendance or conference affiliation. The number of Henson All-Americans returned to 30 for the 2013–14 season and has remained at that number ever since (with the possibility of additional members should there be a tie in voting). From 2011–12 through 2015–16, players on the Olson All-America team, even if they came from mid-major schools, were not eligible for the Henson Award.

The above policy was modified for 2016–17, although CollegeInsider.com did not publicly announce all details. For the first time since the establishment of the Olson All-America team, members of that team were eligible for selection as Henson All-Americans. In that season, three players from Henson-eligible conferences—Alec Peters of Valparaiso, Justin Robinson of Monmouth, and Nigel Williams-Goss of Gonzaga—were selected to the Olson team. When the Henson team was announced, Peters and Robinson (who ultimately won the Henson Award) were on that team, but Williams-Goss was missing—despite the Henson team including another player from Gonzaga's home of the West Coast Conference (specifically Jock Landale of Saint Mary's). Williams-Goss was a consensus second-team All-American that season.

Definitions of the term "mid-major" in the context of college basketball vary widely. For purposes of both the Henson All-America Team and Henson Award, CollegeInsider.com has established its own definition of the term, which includes members of the following conferences, as well as any basketball independents (there have been none since NJIT joined the Atlantic Sun Conference in 2015):

 America East Conference
 ASUN Conference
 Big Sky Conference
 Big South Conference
 Big West Conference
 Colonial Athletic Association
 Horizon League
 Ivy League
 Metro Atlantic Athletic Conference
 Mid-American Conference
 Mid-Eastern Athletic Conference
 Missouri Valley Conference
 Northeast Conference
 Ohio Valley Conference
 Patriot League
 Southern Conference
 Southland Conference
 Southwestern Athletic Conference
 Summit League
 Sun Belt Conference
 West Coast Conference
 Western Athletic Conference

The list of eligible conferences has always excluded all conferences that sponsor FBS football except for the MAC and the Sun Belt. The Atlantic 10 Conference, which has not sponsored football at all since 2006, has also been excluded throughout the award's history. Following major conference realignment that peaked in 2013, the WAC, which dropped football after the 2012 season, was added to the eligible list, while both offshoots of the original Big East Conference—the FBS American Athletic Conference and the current non-football Big East—were excluded from eligibility.

Winners

Winners by school

Players from eligible conferences ineligible for the award
From the 2011–12 season, when the Olson All-America Team was established, through the 2015–16 season, players named to that team were ineligible for the Henson Award, even if they played at eligible schools. The following players were ineligible for the Henson Award due solely to being named to the Olson All-America Team. Individuals in bold were consensus first- or second-team All-Americans in the same season.

2011–12
Isaiah Canaan, Murray State
 D. J. Cooper, Ohio
 Michael Glover, Iona
 Orlando Johnson, UC Santa Barbara
 Damian Lillard, Weber State
 Scott Machado, Iona
 CJ McCollum, Lehigh
Doug McDermott, Creighton

2012–13
 Ian Clark, Belmont
 Ray McCallum, Detroit
 Doug McDermott, Creighton
 Mike Muscala, Bucknell
Kelly Olynyk, Gonzaga
 Nate Wolters, South Dakota State

2013–14
 Ron Baker, Wichita State
 Billy Baron, Canisius
Cleanthony Early, Wichita State

2014–15
 Ron Baker, Wichita State
 Kyle Collinsworth, BYU
 Kevin Pangos, Gonzaga
 Cameron Payne, Murray State
Seth Tuttle, Northern Iowa
 Fred VanVleet, Wichita State
Kyle Wiltjer, Gonzaga

2015–16
 Kay Felder, Oakland
 Justin Robinson, Monmouth
 Domantas Sabonis, Gonzaga
 Fred VanVleet, Wichita State

References
General

Specific

External links
Official site

Awards established in 2010
College basketball trophies and awards in the United States